Geoffrey William Algernon Howard JP (12 February 1877 – 20 June 1935) was an English Liberal politician. He served as Vice-Chamberlain of the Household under H. H. Asquith between 1911 and 1915.

Background and education

Howard was the fifth son of George Howard, 9th Earl of Carlisle, and The Honourable Rosalind Frances Stanley, daughter of Edward Stanley, 2nd Baron Stanley of Alderley. He was educated at Trinity College, Cambridge, where he graduated as a Master of Arts. He was also joint Secretary of the Cambridge University Liberal Club from 1897 to 1899.

On the break-up of his father's estates (which had been left to his mother and subsequently to his sister Lady Mary, wife of Gilbert Murray), he was allocated Castle Howard.

Political career
Howard was selected as Liberal candidate for the Eskdale division of Cumberland at the 1906 General Election. As part of the Liberal landslide victory he gained the seat for the party, ousting the sitting Conservative Claude Lowther with a swing of 6%.

In 1909 he was appointed private secretary to the Parliamentary Secretary to the Board of Trade, Harold Tennant. 
The Liberal Party lost ground at the January 1910 general election, but Howard held his seat, and was appointed private secretary to the Prime Minister H. H. Asquith.

Another General Election followed 11 months later but this time Howard lost his Eskdale seat to Claude Lowther.

Out of Parliament, he was keen to make a return as soon as possible. In 1911 a vacancy occurred in the Westbury division of Wiltshire when the sitting Liberal MP resigned to take up a diplomatic appointment. Howard was chosen as the Liberal candidate for the resulting by-election and retained the seat with a slightly reduced majority.

In 1911 Asquith appointed him Vice-Chamberlain of the Household, a post he held until 1915. He then served as a Junior Lord of the Treasury from 1915 to 1916. In 1916 Asquith was replaced as Prime Minister by Lloyd George and went into opposition to the Coalition Government. Howard followed Asquith into opposition. As a result, when the Coalition was endorsing candidates for the 1918 General election, at Westbury, endorsement was given to his Unionist opponent George Palmer, who defeated Howard by a margin of 17%.

At the 1922 general election, he sought a return to Parliament in his old stomping ground of Cumberland when he contested the unionist-held North Cumberland. However, he lost narrowly, by a margin of 1.6%.

The next year, at the 1923 general election, Howard fought the Luton division of Bedfordshire. The Liberals were experiencing something of a revival nationally, which helped him win the seat from the sitting Unionist Sir John Prescott Hewett.

Another general election followed a year later in 1924, and with the Unionists in the ascendency, he lost his seat. This effectively ended Howard's parliamentary career as he did not contest another parliamentary seat.

Apart from his political career Howard was also a Justice of Peace and a temporary lieutenant in the Royal Naval Division in 1914. In 1931 he became Lord Lieutenant of the North Riding of Yorkshire, which he remained until his death four years later.

Family
Howard married the Honourable Ethel Christian Methuen, daughter of Field Marshal Paul Methuen, 3rd Baron Methuen, on 15 May 1915. They had five children, two daughters and three sons, including Dame Christian Howard and the life peer George Howard, Baron Howard of Henderskelfe. His other two sons, Mark and Christopher, were both killed in action in 1944.  Ethel Howard died in April 1932, aged 43. Howard died in June 1935, aged 58.

References

External links 
 

1877 births
1935 deaths
Alumni of Trinity College, Cambridge
Liberal Party (UK) MPs for English constituencies
Lord-Lieutenants of the North Riding of Yorkshire
UK MPs 1906–1910
UK MPs 1910
UK MPs 1910–1918
UK MPs 1923–1924
Parliamentary Private Secretaries to the Prime Minister
Younger sons of earls
Geoffrey Howard
Royal Navy officers of World War I